Q'asiri (Aymara for bawler, Hispanicized spellings Casiri, Kasiri) is a mountain in the Cordillera Real in the Andes of Bolivia, about 5,828 m (19,121 ft) high. It is located in the La Paz Department, Larecaja Province, Sorata Municipality. It is situated south-east of the mountain Janq'u Uma, north-west of the mountains Qalsata and Ch'iyar Juqhu and north-east of San Francisco Lake.

The rivers Jisk'a Q'asiri ("little Q'asiri", Jiska Khasiri) and Jach'a Q'asiri ("big Q'asiri", Jacha Khasiri) originate on the west side of the mountain. They flow to San Francisco Lake.

See also
 Illampu
 List of mountains in the Andes

External links 
 Sorata Municipality: population data and map showing Lake San Francisco. Q'asiri is situated north east of it.

References 

Mountains of La Paz Department (Bolivia)